Launch or launched may refer to:

Involving vehicles 

 Launch (boat), an open motor boat, often auxiliary to a larger vessel
 Motor Launch, a small military vessel used by the Royal Navy
 Air launch, the practice of dropping an aircraft, rocket, or missile from a launch aircraft
 Rocket launch, first phase of a rocket flight
 Ceremonial ship launching, when a vessel is slid into the water from a slipway

Arts and media
Launched (album), a 2000 album by Beatsteaks
"The Launch" (song), 1999 song
Launch (Dragon Ball), a character in Dragon Ball media
The Launch, Canadian musical TV show
The Launch EP, the debut EP from the show
Launch Media, creators of LAUNCH magazine and LAUNCH.com
LAUNCHcast (now known as Yahoo! Music Radio), an Internet radio service

Other uses 
LAUNCH (Innovation Challenge), a program sponsored by NASA, Nike, USAID and US Department of State
Product launch, the introduction of a new product to market
Soft launch, a preview release of a product or service to a limited audience prior to the general public

See also
Launcher (disambiguation)
 The Launching (1968 TV episode) episode of Captain Scarlet